Club Deportivo Pilmahue, also known as Pilmahue, is a Chilean football club based in the city of Villarrica. They currently play at the fourth level of Chilean football, the Tercera A of Chile.

Stadium 
The stadium of Pilmahue, is the Stadium Matías Vidal Pérez.

 Direction: Villarrica, Chile
 Capacity: 4,000

Coach 
  Freddy Ferragut (2017–18)
  John Bustamante (2018-)

Honours

Uniform 
 Home Uniform: Green shirt, green pants and half black.
 Away Uniform: White shirt, green pants and half black.

Sponsors

References 

Football clubs in Chile